The German American Bund, or the German American Federation, was a German-American Nazi organization which was established in 1936 as a successor to the Friends of New Germany (FoNG, FDND in German). The organization chose its new name in order to emphasize its American credentials after the press accused it of being unpatriotic. The Bund was allowed to consist only of American citizens of German descent. Its main goal was to promote a favorable view of Nazi Germany.

History

Friends of New Germany

In May 1933, Nazi Deputy Führer Rudolf Hess gave German immigrant and German Nazi Party member Heinz Spanknöbel authority to form an American Nazi organization. Shortly thereafter, with help from the German consul in New York City, Spanknöbel created the Friends of New Germany by merging two older organizations in the United States, Gau-USA and the Free Society of Teutonia, which were both small groups with only a few hundred members each. The FoNG was based in New York City but had a strong presence in Chicago. Male members wore a uniform, a white shirt, black trousers and a black hat adorned with a red symbol. Female members wore a white blouse and a black skirt.

The organization which was led by Spanknöbel was openly pro-Nazi, and it engaged in activities such as storming the German language New Yorker Staats-Zeitung and demanding that it publish pro-Nazi articles, and infiltrating other non-political German-American organizations. One of the Friends' early initiatives was to use propaganda to counter the Jewish boycott of German goods, which was started in March 1933 as a protest against Nazi anti-Semitism.

In an internal battle for control of the Friends, Spanknöbel was ousted as its leader and subsequently, he was deported in October 1933 because he had failed to register as a foreign agent.

At the same time, Congressman Samuel Dickstein, Chairman of the Committee on Naturalization and Immigration, became aware of the substantial number of foreigners who were legally and illegally entering the country and residing in it, and the growing anti-Semitism along with vast amounts of anti-Semitic literature which were being distributed in the country. This led him to independently investigate the activities of Nazi and fascist groups, leading to the formation of the Special Committee on Un-American Activities which was Authorized to Investigate Nazi Propaganda activities and Certain Other Propaganda Activities. Throughout the rest of 1934, the Committee conducted hearings, bringing most of the major figures in the American fascist movement before it. Dickstein's investigation concluded that the Friends represented a branch of German dictator Adolf Hitler's Nazi Party in the United States.

The organization existed into the mid-1930s, although it always remained small, with a membership of between 5,000 and 10,000, mostly consisting of German citizens who were living in the United States and German emigrants who had only recently become citizens. In December 1935, Rudolf Hess ordered all German citizens to leave the FoNG and all of its leaders were recalled to Germany.

Bund's activities

On March 19, 1936, the German American Bund  was established as a follow-up organization for the Friends of New Germany in Buffalo, New York. The Bund elected a German-born American citizen Fritz Julius Kuhn as its leader (Bundesführer). Kuhn was a veteran of the Bavarian infantry during World War I and an Alter Kämpfer (old fighter) of the Nazi Party who, in 1934, was granted American citizenship. Kuhn was initially effective as a leader and was able to unite the organization and expand its membership but came to be seen simply as an incompetent swindler and liar.

The administrative structure of the Bund mimicked the regional administrative subdivision of the Nazi Party. The German American Bund divided the United States into three Gaue: Gau Ost (East), Gau West and Gau Midwest.  Together the three Gaue comprised 69 Ortsgruppen (local groups): 40 in Gau Ost (17 in New York), 10 in Gau West and 19 in Gau Midwest. Each Gau had its own Gauleiter and staff to direct the Bund operations in the region in accordance with the Führerprinzip. The Bund's national headquarters was located at 178 East 85th Street in the New York City borough of Manhattan.

The Bund established a number of training camps, including Camp Nordland in Sussex County, New Jersey, Camp Siegfried in Yaphank, New York, Camp Hindenburg in Grafton, Wisconsin, Deutschhorst Country Club in Sellersville, Pennsylvania, Camp Bergwald in Bloomingdale, New Jersey, and Camp Highland in Windham, New York. The Bund held rallies with Nazi insignia and procedures such as the Hitler salute and attacked the administration of President Franklin D. Roosevelt, Jewish-American groups, Communism, "Moscow-directed" trade unions and American boycotts of German goods. The organization claimed to show its loyalty to America by displaying the flag of the United States alongside the flag of Nazi Germany at Bund meetings, and declared that George Washington was "the first Fascist" who did not believe democracy would work.

Kuhn and a few other Bundmen traveled to Berlin to attend the 1936 Summer Olympics. During the trip, he visited the Reich Chancellery, where his picture was taken with Hitler. This act did not constitute an official Nazi approval for Kuhn's organization: German Ambassador to the United States Hans-Heinrich Dieckhoff expressed his disapproval and concern over the group to Berlin, causing distrust between the Bund and the Nazi regime. The organization received no financial or verbal support from Germany. In response to the outrage of Jewish war veterans, Congress in 1938 passed the Foreign Agents Registration Act requiring foreign agents to register with the State Department. On March 1, 1938, the Nazi government decreed that no Reichsdeutsche [German nationals] could be a member of the Bund, and that no Nazi emblems were to be used by the organization. This was done both to appease the U.S. and to distance Germany from the Bund, which was increasingly a cause of embarrassment with its rhetoric and actions.

Arguably, the zenith of the Bund's activities was the rally at Madison Square Garden in New York City on February 20, 1939. Some 20,000 people attended and heard Gerhard Wilhelm Kunze, the Bund's National Public Relations Officer, criticize President Roosevelt by repeatedly referring to him as "Frank D. Rosenfeld", calling his New Deal the "Jew Deal", and denouncing what he believed to be Bolshevik-Jewish American leadership. Most shocking to American sensibilities was the outbreak of violence between protesters and Bund storm troopers. The rally was the subject of the 2017 short documentary A Night at the Garden by Marshall Curry.

Decline
In 1939, a New York tax investigation determined that Kuhn had embezzled $14,000 from the Bund. The Bund did not seek to have Kuhn prosecuted, operating on the principle (Führerprinzip) that the leader had absolute power. However, New York City's district attorney prosecuted him in an attempt to cripple the Bund. On December 5, 1939, Kuhn was sentenced to two and a half to five years in prison for tax evasion and embezzlement.

New Bund leaders replaced Kuhn, most notably Gerhard Kunze, but only for brief periods. A year after the outbreak of World War II, Congress enacted a peacetime military draft in September 1940. The Bund counseled members of draft age to evade conscription, a criminal offense punishable by up to five years in jail and a $10,000 fine. Gerhard Kunze fled to Mexico in November 1941. However, Mexican authorities forced him to return to the United States, where he was sentenced to 15 years in prison for espionage.

U.S. Congressman Martin Dies (D-Texas) and his House Committee on Un-American Activities were active in denying any Nazi-sympathetic organization the ability to operate freely during World War II. In the last week of December 1942, led by journalist Dorothy Thompson, fifty leading German-Americans (including baseball icon Babe Ruth) signed a "Christmas Declaration by men and women of German ancestry" condemning Nazism, which appeared in ten major American daily newspapers.

While Kuhn was in prison, his citizenship was canceled on June 1, 1943. Upon his release after 43 months in state prison, Kuhn was re-arrested on June 21, 1943, as an enemy alien and interned by the federal government at a camp in Crystal City, Texas. After the war, Kuhn was interned at Ellis Island and deported to Germany on September 15, 1945. He died on December 14, 1951, in Munich, West Germany.

According to historian Leland V. Bell, George Froboese, the Midwestern leader of the group (who had traveled to the 1936 Berlin Olympics with Kuhn to meet Hitler) and "a few lesser known Bundists committed suicide," and "some Bundists had their naturalizations revoked and spent a few months in detention camps". In addition, 24 officers of the organization were convicted of conspiracy to violate the 1940 Selective Service Act in 1942. All of the defendants received the maximum 5-year sentences allowed under the charge. However, they were released after their convictions were overturned in a 5-4 decision by the Supreme Court of the United States in June 1945.

See also
Christian Front (United States)
Christian Nationalist Crusade
Christian Party (United States, 1930s)
Fascist League of North America
Silver Legion of America
Joe K spy ring, recruited Nazi spies out of the Bund 1940–41

References
Notes

Further reading
 Allen, Joe (2012-2013) "'It Can't Happen Here?': Confronting the Fascist Threat in the US in the Late 1930s". International Socialist Review Part One: n.85 (September-October 2012), pp. 26–35; Part Two: n.87 (January-February 2013) pp. 19–28.
 Bell, Leland V. (1973) In Hitler's Shadow; The Anatomy of American Nazism. Associated Faculty Press.
 Canedy, Susan (1990) Americas Nazis:  A Democratic Dilemma a History of the German American Bund Markgraf Publications Group
 Diamond, Sander (1974) The Nazi Movement in the United States: 1924–1941. Ithaca, New York: Cornell University Press
 Grams, Grant W. (2021) Coming Home to the Third Reich: Return Migration of German Nationals from the United States and Canada, 1933–1941. Jefferson, North Carolina: McFarland Publishers
 Jenkins, Philip (1997) Hoods and Shirts: The Extreme Right in Pennsylvania, 1925–1950 University of North Carolina Press.
 
 
 MacDonnell, Francis (1995) Insidious Foes: The Axis Fifth Column and the American Home Front Oxford University Press.
 
 Miller, Marvin D. (1983) Wunderlich's Salute: The Interrelationship of the German-American Bund, Camp Siegfried, Yaphank, Long Island, and the Young Siegfrieds and Their Relationship with American and Nazi Institutions Malamud-Rose Publishers.
 Norwood, Stephen H (2003) "Marauding Youth and the Christian Front: Antisemitic Violence in Boston and New York during World War II" American Jewish History, v.91
 Schneider, James C. (1989) Should America Go to War? The Debate over Foreign Policy in Chicago, 1939–1941 University of North Carolina Press
 St. George, Maximiliam and Dennis, Lawrence (1946)A Trial on Trial: The Great Sedition Trial of 1944 National Civil Rights Committee.
 Strong, Donald S. (1941) Organized Anti-Semitism in America: The Rise of Group Prejudice during the Decade 1930–40

External links

Home Grown Nazis - A 13 part series for the Chicago Times in Sept. 1937 on Nazi activities in Chicago based on undercover reporting of Chicago Times reporters.
Collection of articles in the Mid-Island Mail related to Bund activity in Yaphank, New York (1935–1941) (Longwood Public Library)
 Mp3 of National Leader Fritz Julius Kuhn address at the 1939 Madison Square Garden rally (from Talking History: The Radio Archives)
What Price the Federal Reserve? – Illustrated anti-Semitic pamphlet issued by the Bund
 Awake and Act – Pamphlet listing the purposes and aims of the German American Bund
 U.S. Holocaust Memorial Museum article on German-American Bund
  – Article by Jim Bredemus
 FBI Records: German American Federation/Bund
 Materials produced by the Bund are found in the Florence Mendheim Collection of Anti-Semitic Propaganda (#AR 25441); Leo Baeck Institute, New York.

 
1936 establishments in the United States
1941 disestablishments in the United States
Defunct organizations based in New York City
German-American history
Nazi propaganda organizations
Organizations based in New York City
Political history of the United States
White supremacist groups in the United States
Fascist organizations
Anti-communist organizations in the United States
Non-interventionism
1930s in the United States